Marvin Luster (November 27, 1937 – May 25, 2020) was an American gridiron football defensive back and end. He played college football at UCLA and professional football in the Canadian Football League (CFL) from 1961 to 1974. He was inducted into the Canadian Football Hall of Fame in 1990.

Early Years
A native of Shreveport, Louisiana, Luster later moved westwards where he graduated from Belmont High School in Los Angeles, California. He attended the nearby UCLA where he ran track and also played for the UCLA Bruins football team. During the 1958, 1959, and 1960 NCAA seasons with the UCLA football team, he played on defense and offense (at the back and end positions) and caught 44 passes for 728 yards and eight touchdowns. During the summer of 1959, the movie Sergeant Rutledge was in production in Utah and Luster and his UCLA football teammate Gene Gaines both got one of the eleven uncredited roles as a trooper created by the film's Director, John Ford, according to AFI.com and IMDb.com. He was selected by the United Press International as a first-team end on its 1960 All-Pacific Coast football team.

Professional Football
Luster was selected by the Los Angeles Rams in the 1960 NFL Draft, and by the rival AFL's Buffalo Bills but opted instead to play in the Canadian Football League (CFL). From 1961 to 1974, Luster starred as a defensive back for the Toronto Argonauts and Montreal Alouettes being first in Montreal for 1961-1964, then up Highway 401 to Toronto for 1964-1972, and then back down that highway to Montreal for 1973-1974. He was selected six times as a CFL All-Star (–) and was part of the 1974 Alouettes team that won the Grey Cup. After that first Grey Cup win, with his old UCLA teammate and movie co-star Gene Gaines also on that winning team, Luster retired from football. In 1990, Luster was inducted into the Canadian Football Hall of Fame for his efforts. In November 2006, he was selected by the Canadian sports network TSN as one of the Top 50 players (#35) of the CFL's modern era.

Later years and death 
After retiring from football, Luster resided in Atlanta. He died from complications of COVID-19 during the COVID-19 pandemic in North Carolina, at an assisted living facility in Matthews, North Carolina.

References

External links
 Just Sports Stats
 College stats

1937 births
2020 deaths
American players of Canadian football
Canadian football defensive backs
Canadian Football Hall of Fame inductees
Montreal Alouettes players
Players of American football from Shreveport, Louisiana
Toronto Argonauts players
UCLA Bruins football players
Deaths from the COVID-19 pandemic in North Carolina